This is a list of electoral results for the Central Highlands Province in Victorian state elections.

Members for Central Highlands Province

Election results

Elections in the 2000s

Elections in the 1990s

Elections in the 1980s

Elections in the 1970s

 Two party preferred vote was estimated.

References

Victoria (Australia) state electoral results by district